The 1922 New South Wales Rugby Football League premiership was the fifteenth season of Sydney’s top-grade rugby league club competition, Australia’s first. Nine teams from across the city contested the season which culminated in North Sydney’s victory over Glebe in the premiership final.

Season summary
After the clubs had played each other twice, Norths and Glebe were tied atop the points table. Instead of the points differential rule being implemented a Grand Final was held to determine the premier.

St George had another disappointing season, winning only two games against University and conceding 316 points  averaging 19.75 per game.

Teams
 Balmain, formed on January 23, 1908, at Balmain Town Hall
 Eastern Suburbs, formed on January 24, 1908, at Paddington Town Hall
 Glebe, formed on January 9, 1908
 Newtown, formed on January 14, 1908
 North Sydney, formed on February 7, 1908
 South Sydney, formed on January 17, 1908, at Redfern Town Hall
 St George, formed on November 8, 1920, at Kogarah School of Arts
 Western Suburbs, formed on February 4, 1908
 University, formed in 1919 at Sydney University

Ladder

Final

As North Sydney and Glebe were tied on competition points a final was played at the Sydney Cricket Ground on 6 September, before a crowd of around 15,000. The match was officiated by Tom McMahon, the elder of the two pre-war referees of that name.

The game was not as even as the ladder at the end of regular season would have suggested. Norths completely got away to a 10-0 lead at half-time and went on to demolish Glebe 35-3, taking their second consecutive premiership crown. The legendary Harold Horder scored twenty individual points in the match.

North Sydney 35 (Tries: Rule 2, Blinkhorn 2, Horder 2, Peters. Goals: Horder 7 )

defeated

Glebe 3 (Try: E Summers)

References

External links
 Rugby League Tables - Notes AFL Tables
 Rugby League Tables - Season 1922 AFL Tables
 Premiership History and Statistics RL1908
 Results: 1921-30 at rabbitohs.com.au

New South Wales Rugby League premiership
Nswrfl season